is the Japanese word for . It is also a Japanese given name natively written in a variety of forms. While a unisex name, it is more commonly used by women.

Possible writings
Mitsuki can be written using different kanji characters and can mean:
三月, "three months"
as a given name
満月, "full, moon"
美月, "beauty, moon"
光月, "light, moon"
光希, "light, rare"
光揮, "light, wield"
光輝, "light, brightness"
充喜, "raise, rejoice"
参月, "three, moon"
参輝, "three, shine"
The name can also be written in hiragana or katakana.

People
with the given name Mitsuki
, a Japanese techno-pop artist
, a Japanese singer (former Kamen Rider Girls)
, a Japanese footballer
, a Japanese actor
, a Japanese voice actress
, a Japanese fashion model and actress
, a Japanese voice actress
, a Japanese footballer
, a Japanese figure skater
, a Japanese visual kei musician (Kiryu)
, a Japanese actress and singer
, a Japanese actress
, Japanese footballer
 Mitski (born 1990), Japanese-American musician

Fictional characters
With the given name Mitsuki
Mitsuki, a character in the American animated sitcom Kappa Mikey
Mitsuki, a minor character in the anime series Tenchi Universe
Mitsuki, a character in the manga series Tokyo Babylon
Mitsuki, the official mascot of Tsubasacon
, a character in the tokusatsu series Unofficial Sentai Akibaranger
, a character in the manga series My Hero Academia
, a character in the adventure game and anime series Kimi ga Nozomu Eien
, a character in the manga and anime series Full Moon o Sagashite
, a character in the anime series Dual! Parallel Trouble Adventure
, a character in the anime series Dual! Parallel Trouble Adventure
, a character in the manga and anime series He Is My Master
Mitsuki Yamamoto, a character in the game series Corpse Party
, a character in the anime series Kyoukai no Kanata
, a character in the anime series Recently, My Sister Is Unusual
Mitsuki (Naruto) (巳月), a character in the manga series Boruto: Naruto Next Generations
 Mitsuki, or 'Tsu', a character from the Dynamite Produced comic Skin&Earth, written and drawn by Canadian pop-singer, Lights
 , a character in the mobile game and anime franchise IDOLiSH7
with the surname Mitsuki
, a character in the manga series Heaven's Lost Property

Japanese unisex given names
Japanese feminine given names
Japanese-language surnames